Taismary Agüero Leiva  (born March 5, 1977) is a Cuban-born Italian volleyball player. She is the only player to represent two women's volleyball national team to win Major titles (1995 FIVB World Cup, 1996 Atlanta Olympic Games, 1998 FIVB World Championship, 1999 FIVB World Cup and 2000 Sydney Olympic Games for Cuba; 2007 FIVB World Cup for Italy).

Life
Born in Yaguajay in the province of Sancti Spiritus, when she began to play volleyball when she was eight years old. Two years later, she entered in the Cerro Pelado Training Center in Havana. In 1993 she won the junior women's volleyball world championship and then joined the senior national team. She did not participate in the 1994 FIVB Women's World Championship, but she won the gold medal at the 1996 Summer Olympics in Atlanta two years later. In 1998 together with Mireya Luis, Regla Bell, Ana Ibis Fernandez, and Mirka Francia she won the 1998 FIVB Women's World Championship in Japan. In 2000, she was a member of the Cuban Woman volleyball national team that won the gold medal at the Sydney. In the summer 2001, she left the Cuban National Team during a tournament in Switzerland and applied for political asylum in Italy . The International Volleyball Federation (FIVB) allowed her to play in Italy despite the opposition of Cuban volleyball federation and she joined Pallavolo Sirio Perugia, an Italian volleyball club, where she had just played before during the 1998–1999 and 1999–2000 seasons. At the end of 2006 she became an Italian citizen after marrying Alessio Botteghi an Italian physiotherapist who works for the Turkish National Women Volleyball team. In the summer of 2007 she joined the Italian national team.

Career
Agüero had played for two seasons for Sirio Perugia from 1998 to 2000 then she played again for Sirio from 2001 to 2005. From 2005 to 2007 she has played for Asystel Novara. In season 2007/2008 she played for Türk Telekom club in Ankara, in season 2009/2010 she will play for Carnaghi Villa Cortese team in the Italian League. Now Agüero both in club and in national team played as right hitters, while with the Cuban national teams she was setter/hitter.

Titles
In the 1993 junior championship she was named MVP, Best Setter and best server. In 1995 and 1997 she won the Panamerican games with Cuba, and, in 1996 and 2000, the Summer Olympic Games. She was Italian national champion in 2002/2003 and 2004/2005.

Playing for Italy, she won the 2007 European Championship, where she was also declared Most Valuable Player, she has also won the gold medal at 2009 European volleyball Championship

Clubs
 Sirio Perugia (1998–2005)
 Asystel Novara (2005–2007)
 Türk Telekom Ankara (2007–2009)
 Carnaghi Villa Cortese (2009–2011)
 Universal Volley Modena (2011–2013)
 Pomi Casalmaggiore (2013-2014)
 Volley 2002 Forlì (2014–2016)
 Canovi Sassuolo (2016-2018)
 Emilbronzo 2000 Montale (2018-)

Awards

Individuals
 1999 FIVB World Cup "Most Valuable Player"
 1999 FIVB World Cup "Best Server"
 2007 FIVB World Grand Prix "Best Spiker"
 2007 FIVB World Grand Prix "Best Scorer"
 2007 European Championship "Most Valuable Player"

External links

Official website
FIVB Profile

1977 births
Living people
People from Yaguajay
Cuban women's volleyball players
Wing spikers
Italian women's volleyball players
Cuban emigrants to Italy
Naturalised citizens of Italy
Defecting sportspeople of Cuba
Türk Telekom volleyballers
Italian expatriate sportspeople in Turkey
Expatriate volleyball players in Turkey
Olympic medalists in volleyball
Olympic gold medalists for Cuba
Olympic volleyball players of Cuba
Olympic volleyball players of Italy
Volleyball players at the 1996 Summer Olympics
Volleyball players at the 2000 Summer Olympics
Volleyball players at the 2008 Summer Olympics
Medalists at the 1996 Summer Olympics
Medalists at the 2000 Summer Olympics
Mediterranean Games medalists in volleyball
Mediterranean Games gold medalists for Italy
Competitors at the 2009 Mediterranean Games
Pan American Games medalists in volleyball
Pan American Games silver medalists for Cuba
Medalists at the 1999 Pan American Games